Teremitra is a genus of sea snails, marine gastropod molluscs in the family Pyramimitridae, the mitre snails.

Species
Species within the genus Teremitra include:
 Teremitra efatensis (Aubry, 1999)
 Teremitra fallax Kantor, Lozouet, Puillandre & Bouchet, 2014

References

 Kantor Y., Lozouet P., Puillandre N. & Bouchet P. (2014) Lost and found: The Eocene family Pyramimitridae (Neogastropoda) discovered in the Recent fauna of the Indo-Pacific. Zootaxa 3754(3): 239–276

Pyramimitridae